Thomas Daniel Evans (18 April 1929 – 27 February 1995) was an Australian politician who was a Labor Party member of the Legislative Assembly of Western Australia from 1956 to 1980, representing the seat of Kalgoorlie. He served as a minister in the government of John Tonkin, including as treasurer and attorney-general.

Early life
Evans was born in Denmark, Western Australia, to Kathleen Veronica (née Hayden) and Daniel Thomas Evans. He was educated at various country schools, and later spent two years in Perth studying teaching, attending Claremont Teachers College. As a teacher, Evans spent time at schools in Leonora, Westonia, Gwalia, Roelands, Esperance, Boyup Brook, and Kalgoorlie.

Politics
Evans was elected to parliament at the 1956 state election, aged only 26. He had defeated Herbert Styants (a long-serving MP) for Labor preselection. After entering parliament, he began studying law. He served his articles of clerkship with Tom Hartrey (a future Labor MP), and was called to the bar in 1965.

Following Labor's victory at the 1971 state election, Evans was made Treasurer, Minister for Forests, and Minister for Tourism in the new ministry formed by John Tonkin (also a former schoolteacher). He was the first state treasurer since James Gardiner in 1919 to not serve simultaneously as premier. However, Evans served as treasurer for only seven months, as Tonkin effected a ministerial reshuffle in October 1971 and assumed the position himself. After the reshuffle, Evans was appointed Attorney-General and Minister for Education.

In July 1972, Evans was also made Minister for Recreation. He lost the education portfolio to Jerry Dolan in May 1973, but remained in the ministry until the Labor government's defeat at the 1974 state election. Evans subsequently served in the shadow ministry until the 1977 election, under two leaders of the opposition (John Tonkin and Colin Jamieson).

Later life
Evans left parliament at the 1980 election, and afterwards practised law in Kalgoorlie and Perth, including with his own firm. Evans died in Perth in February 1995, aged 65. He was married twice, firstly to Eileen O'Donnell in 1957, with whom he had three children. He remarried in 1979, to Karen Camilleri (née Broxton).

See also
 Electoral results for the district of Kalgoorlie

References

|-

|-

1929 births
1995 deaths
Attorneys-General of Western Australia
Australian barristers
Australian Labor Party members of the Parliament of Western Australia
Australian schoolteachers
Members of the Western Australian Legislative Assembly
People from Denmark, Western Australia
Treasurers of Western Australia
20th-century Australian politicians